Eduardo Katsuhiro Barbosa (born 16 November 1991) is a Brazilian judoka.

He won a medal at the 2019 World Judo Championships.

He represented Brazil at the 2020 Summer Olympics.

References

External links
 

1991 births
Living people
Brazilian male judoka
Judoka at the 2020 Summer Olympics
Olympic judoka of Brazil
20th-century Brazilian people
21st-century Brazilian people
People from Registro